The 2005–06 Eredivisie season was the 46th season of the Eredivisie, the top level of ice hockey in the Netherlands. Six teams participated in the league, and the Nijmegen Emperors won the championship.

Regular season

Playoffs

External links 
 Season on hockeyarchives.info

Neth
Eredivisie (ice hockey) seasons
Ere 
Ere